Fockerby railway station was a station in Fockerby, Lincolnshire. It served as the terminus of a branch of the Axholme Joint Railway. It is now closed.

The station opened with the line on 10 August 1903, and closed with the end of passenger services on 17 July 1933.

Route

References

Disused railway stations in the Borough of North Lincolnshire
Former Axholme Joint Railway stations
Railway stations in Great Britain opened in 1903
Railway stations in Great Britain closed in 1933